The Yokohama Shindō (横浜新道) is a major highway located entirely in the city of Yokohama in the Greater Tokyo Area of Japan. It is signed as a bypass of National Route 1 as well as being partially designated as an expressway numbered E83. It is a bypass that travels from the southwestern corner of the city in Totsuka-ku northeast to Kanagawa-ku. It largely serves as a bypass to the west of central Yokohama.

Route description
The Yokohama Shindō is a bypass that travels from the southwestern corner of the Yokohama in Totsuka-ku northeast through Hodogaya-ku to Kanagawa-ku. It largely serves as a bypass to the west of central Yokohama. The bypass begins at an intersection in Kanagawa-ku with the main line of National Route 1. From this eastern terminus, it travels southwest, then west through the ward. It crosses into Hodogaya-ku then turns to the southwest again. Just after entering the ward it has a junction with the Mitsuzawa Route and the Daisan Keihin Road. This junction is the beginning of the expressway section of the Yokohama Shindō. The expressway has another major junction with the Yokohama Yokosuka Road in Hodogaya-ku before crossing into Totsuka-ku. In Totsuka-ku, the expressway has a few more interchanges before transitioning back to a highway with signaled intersections. After this transition, the road eventually ends at an intersection with the main line of National Route 1.

History
The route that would eventually become the free section of the Yokohama Shindō was established in 1948 during the Occupation of Japan as a bypass of the older Tōkaidō. After the occupation's end in 1952, management of the road was handed over to the Japan Highway Public Corporation and the road was designated as a bypass of National Route 1 on 4 December 1952. The tolled expressway section was established in 1957. Construction of the expressway took two years, with construction being completed and the expressway opening on 28 October 1959.

Gallery

Junction list
The entire expressway lies within Yokohama in Kanagawa Prefecture. Junctions are at-grade unless noted otherwise.

See also

References

External links

Expressways in Japan
1948 establishments in Japan
Roads in Kanagawa Prefecture